Michael Phillips (born 1938) is a published author of eleven books and a founder of the Briarpatch Network. As a banker in 1967 he organized Mastercard.  Phillips was president of the Point Foundation in 1973; Point was created with money from the Whole Earth Catalog. Writing for the CoEvolution Quarterly in 1976 he was the first person to suggest random selection of legislators and co-authored the first book on the subject in 1985. Phillips has been an expert witness in more than a dozen public utility cases on behalf of major American minority organizations. From 1988 to 1998 he produced and hosted the national public radio program Social Thought. He is also a pro-business blogger.

Books
The Seven Laws of Money, Random House, 1974
Marketing Without Advertising, Nolo Press 1984
Honest Business, Random House 1982
Commerce, Clear Glass Press, 2000
Simple Living Investments, Clear Glass Publishing, 1982

External links
Web page on The Well
Full bio on The Well
blog site
Mastercard: Gifford Pinchot 1986

References

1938 births
Living people